The 1910–11 Missouri Tigers men's basketball team represented University of Missouri in the 1910–11 college basketball season. The team was led by first year head coach Chester Brewer.  The captain of the team was Herman Cohen.

Missouri finished with a 5–7 record overall and a 5–7 record in the Missouri Valley Intercollegiate Athletic Association.  This was good enough for a 4th-place finish in the regular season conference standings.

Schedule and results

References

Missouri
Missouri Tigers men's basketball seasons
Tiger
Tiger